Ana Savić was the defending champion, having won the event in 2012, but did not participate in 2013.

Vitalia Diatchenko won the tournament, defeating Marta Sirotkina in the all-Russian final, 6–7(3–7), 6–4, 6–4.

Seeds

Main draw

Finals

Top half

Bottom half

References 
 Main draw

Ankara Cup - Singles
Ankara Cup